The Athletics at the 2016 Summer Paralympics – Men's 100 metres T52 event at the 2016 Paralympic Games took place on 9–10 September 2016, at the Estádio Olímpico João Havelange.

Heats

Heat 1 
10:21 9 September 2016:

Heat 2 
10:27 9 September 2016:

Final 
10:48 10 September 2016:

Notes

Athletics at the 2016 Summer Paralympics